Joseph Michael Dougherty (3 July 1901 – 8 February 1981) was an American rower. He competed at the 1928 Summer Olympics in Amsterdam with the men's coxed pair with Augustus Goetz and Thomas Mack as coxswain where they were eliminated in the round one repechage. At the 1936 Summer Olympics in Berlin, he again competed in the coxed pair, this time with Tom Curran and George Loveless as coxswain.

References

1901 births
1981 deaths
American male rowers
Olympic rowers of the United States
Rowers at the 1928 Summer Olympics
Rowers at the 1936 Summer Olympics
Rowers from Philadelphia
European Rowing Championships medalists